Ekya Schools, Bangalore is a chain of progressive K12 and Early Years schools based out of Bangalore, India. Ekya Schools was founded in 2010. It is a part of the CMR Group of Institutions and the National Public School. The school motto is "Together as One".

Leadership 

 Dr. Tristha Ramamurthy - Vice President, CMR Group of Institutions | Founder and Managing Director, Ekya Schools 
 Jyothi Menon - Vice Principal, Ekya School, ITPL 
 Sreepriya Unnikrishnan - Vice Principal, Ekya School, JP Nagar 
 Deeparani V  - Vice Principal, Ekya School, BTM Layout 
 Shubhra Sinha - Vice Principal, Ekya School, Byrathi

References

Private schools in Bangalore
High schools and secondary schools in Bangalore
Cambridge schools in India
International schools in Bangalore